Noel Gay (15 July 1898 – 4 March 1954) was born Reginald Moxon Armitage. He also used the name Stanley Hill professionally. He was a successful British composer of popular music of the 1930s and 1940s whose output comprised 45 songs as well as the music for 28 films and 26 London shows. Sheridan Morley has commented that he was "the closest Britain ever came to a local Irving Berlin". He is best known for the musical, Me and My Girl.

Early life
Armitage was born in Wakefield, Yorkshire, England. He was educated at Queen Elizabeth Grammar School before obtaining a scholarship at the age of 15 to attend the Royal College of Music in London, after which he attended university. A precocious talent, he had deputised for the choirmaster of Wakefield Cathedral from the age of eight, becoming honorary deputy organist at twelve. He had become music director and organist at St. Anne's Church in London's Soho district by the age of eighteen, prior a brief period of military service during the First World War and then studied at Christ's College, Cambridge.

Career 
Whilst at Cambridge, Armitage's interest in religious music and composition declined as that in musical comedy grew. He began writing popular songs, using the stage name Noel Gay. According to Morley the name was derived "from a sign he read on a London bus in 1924: 'NOEL Coward and Maisie GAY in a new revue'." His pseudonym of Stanley Hill was used from time to time for his more sentimental work. After contributing to revues such as Stop Press he was commissioned to write the entire score and lyrics for André Charlot's 1926 revue. His next show was Clowns in Clover, which starred Cicely Courtneidge and Jack Hulbert, a husband-and-wife team of the time.

Gay's career blossomed due to his talent for writing catchy, popular melodies in styles ranging from music hall to operetta.

His most famous show, for which he contributed the music but not the lyrics, was Me and My Girl. This originally opened in 1937 at the Victoria Palace Theatre, London and, after a shaky start, gained popularity when the BBC broadcast it live on radio on 13 January 1938. It starred Lupino Lane as Bill Snibson and it ran for 1,646 performances despite being bombed out of two theatres. The "showstopper" in that work was "The Lambeth Walk" which has the distinction of being the only popular song to be the subject of a leader in The Times. In October 1938 one of its leaders read "While dictators rage and statesmen talk, all Europe dances – to 'The Lambeth Walk'." The show was revived in 1952 and again in 1984, when the book was revised by Stephen Fry and came to include some of Gay's own songs. The latter production ran for eight years, initially at the Haymarket Theatre in Leicester and then at the Adelphi Theatre in London, before going on tour throughout Britain and transferring to Broadway.

Gay went on to write songs for revues by The Crazy Gang, and for star artists like Gracie Fields, Flanagan and Allen and George Formby, as well as penning popular World War II songs such as "Run Rabbit Run" (with lyrics by Ralph Butler). He wrote two songs for the 1938 comedy film Save a Little Sunshine.

After the war, his musical output diminished and he concentrated more on production, in part because of increasing deafness and also because the fashion for cheerful Cockney-themed songs was on the wane.

He had created Noel Gay Music in 1938 as a business vehicle. It now forms a part of the Noel Gay Organisation which includes divisions for television and theatre and is a significant British showbusiness agency, under the day-to-day control of his family.

His son, Richard Armitage, set up the Noel Gay Artists agency and became an influential talent agent.

Shows
Gay contributed to numerous shows, almost all of them musical comedies or revues. Grove Music Online lists the following, except where the genre is stated as uncertain or as pantomime:

Songs
Among Noel Gay's songs were the following, sourced from US Library of Congress copyright catalogues and the catalogue of the National Library of Australia as indicated.

Some of his songs featured in the film Overlord

Bibliography
Dickinson, Stephen (1999). Marigold: The Music of Billy Mayerl. Oxford: Oxford University Press.
Ganzl, Kurt (1986). The British Musical Theatre. Oxford: Oxford University Press.

References

English musical theatre composers
English male composers
Musicians from Wakefield
1898 births
1954 deaths
Alumni of the Royal College of Music
Alumni of Christ's College, Cambridge
People educated at Queen Elizabeth Grammar School, Wakefield
Musicians from Yorkshire
20th-century English composers
20th-century British male musicians